Mandy Takhar is a British actress who works in Indian cinema, predominantly in Punjabi with roles in Hindi and Tamil films as well.

Early life
Mandy Takhar was born and raised in the city of Wolverhampton in the UK. She traces her roots to Maliana, a small village near Phagwara in Punjab, India. She moved to London from her family home when she was 17, to study drama at the Kingston University and then left the UK in 2009 to work as an actor in the Indian film industry.

Career
Mandy moved to Mumbai and landed the role opposite renowned Punjabi singer Babbu Mann in the 2010 film, Ekam - Son of Soil. She played the lead role opposite the superstar Gippy Grewal in the film Mirza - The Untold Story. She played Sahiba in this modern adaptation of the love story of Mirza-Sahiba. Her portrayal of Sahiba got her nominated for the best actress at the PTC Punjabi Film Awards.

In 2013, she starred in Tu Mera 22 Main Tera 22 a comedy alongside Amrinder Gill and Honey Singh. She played the role of a teacher and won hearts again and got the award for most prominent & popular face and youth Icon of 2012-2013 at the 6th Punjabi Film and Music Festival.

She made her debut in Tamil cinema with Venkat Prabhu's Biriyani starring Karthi. She won the award for best supporting actor at PTC Punjabi Film Awards.

In early 2017 she appeared in the Punjabi film Rabb Da Radio.

In 2017 she co-hosted the Brit Asia TV Music Awards with Sukhi Bart.

Filmography

Music videos

Awards and nominations

References

External links

Living people
Actors from Wolverhampton
British film actresses
British female models
British people of Punjabi descent
British actresses of Indian descent
Punjabi people
Actresses in Hindi cinema
Actresses in Punjabi cinema
Actresses in Tamil cinema
British expatriate actresses in India
European actresses in India
Alumni of Kingston University
Year of birth missing (living people)
21st-century British actresses